Priya Gill is a former Indian actress. She appeared mainly in Hindi films, along with a film each in Punjabi, Malayalam, Tamil, Bhojpuri and movies in Telugu. She was the second runner-up in Miss India 1995.

Film career
Gill began her Bollywood career with the ABCL production Tere Mere Sapne (1996) along with Arshad Warsi and Chandrachur Singh. Other film appearances include the hit films Sirf Tum (1999), Josh (2000) and Red (2002). After appearing in some Malayalam, Tamil, Telugu and Punjabi films, she left acting in 2006.

Filmography

References

External links 

 
 
 

Living people
Indian film actresses
Actresses in Punjabi cinema
Actresses in Malayalam cinema
20th-century Indian actresses
21st-century Indian actresses
Miss International 1995 delegates
Actresses in Telugu cinema
Actresses in Tamil cinema
Actresses in Bhojpuri cinema
Actresses in Hindi cinema
Year of birth missing (living people)
Screen Awards winners